Steven Gregory Drozd (born June 11, 1969) is an American musician and actor. He is a composer, multi-instrumentalist, and songwriter for the Flaming Lips, Electric Würms, and other projects.

Early life
Drozd was born in Houston, Texas, and grew up in Richmond and Rosenberg, Texas, with three brothers and a sister. He attended George Junior High & BF Terry High School. His father, Vernon, was a member of the polka band Vernon Drozd and the Texas Brass. At the age of ten, he began playing drums with his father's band and later played piano in various country honky-tonk groups. After high school, Drozd moved to Oklahoma City and performed, mainly on drums, with a number of underground bands in the area.

The Flaming Lips
Drozd joined the Flaming Lips in 1991 as a drummer. While his style is influenced by the drum sounds of the 1970s, his time spent with his father's polka band helped him develop a sense of delicacy and syncopation. His thick grooves, with episodes of odd-time funk, are interspersed with straight-ahead rock, mixing various genres. In 1999, while touring The Soft Bulletin, Drozd decided to assume guitar duties as well as keyboards and backing vocals, using his drum tracks during live performances, but he still drums on the studio albums to this day.

Other ventures
He is the songwriting/musician half of You in Me, a Neil Diamond-inspired duo, with Alan Novey on vocals. Drozd writes the songs, and he and Novey perform them as a tribute to Diamond.

He and Steve Burns created the band StevenSteven, a children's psychedelic music project.

The artist Imagene Peise is an elevator music-style covers and originals, culled from the home recordings of Drozd with the imagery and myth being from the imagination of Wayne Coyne.

Drozd and Coyne have a second group together called Electric Würms, with Drozd taking the lead role in the band. Influenced by prog rock, krautrock, and punk rock, their goal is to explore the outer reaches of traditional "rock" music, as well-performing Flaming Lips deeper cuts. Nashville-based Linear Downfall completes the ensemble.

Contributing work 
Drozd has appeared on a number of recordings of other artists, including Elliott Smith's From a Basement on the Hill, Jay Farrar's Sebastopol and ThirdShiftGrottoSlack and Steve Burns'  Songs for Dustmites. Drozd is featured on the online release of Cake's B-sides and Rarities (2007).

In 2013 Drozd created and directed a volunteer group of music students at ACMUCO called the Mutating Cell Ensemble, whose goal is to experiment with polyrhythm and repetition. They have performed once. Drozd composed and performed on the song "Mattress Warehouse" by Foxygen, off their album ...And Star Power, released on October 14, 2014.

Film work
In the Flaming Lips' film Christmas on Mars (2008), he plays Major Syrtis, the main character of the film. Drozd has appeared on Noggin's Jack's Big Music Show, with Jon Stewart and Steve Burns.

In 2020, he scored the TV series Moonbase 8.

Discography

Solo

Imagene Peise

You in Me

Electric Würms

StevenSteven

References

External links
 Drozd fansite 
 Drozd's Maritime Mixtape

1969 births
Living people
American multi-instrumentalists
The Flaming Lips members
People from Houston
Musicians from Oklahoma
20th-century American drummers
American male drummers
People from Richmond, Texas
People from Rosenberg, Texas